William Amherst Vanderbilt Cecil (August 17, 1928 – October 31, 2017) was the operator of the Biltmore Estate through his company, The Biltmore Company.

Biography

Early life
William Cecil was the younger son of Cornelia Stuyvesant Vanderbilt (1900–1976). He was the grandson of George Washington Vanderbilt II, and the great-grandson of William Henry Vanderbilt. His great-great grandfather was railroad and steamship baron, Commodore Cornelius Vanderbilt.

Career
Cecil was a graduate of Harvard University. Upon the death of his mother, he inherited the Biltmore Estate once his elder brother, George Henry Vanderbilt Cecil, chose to take charge of the family dairy (known as Biltmore Farms) which was much more profitable at the time. He successfully transformed Biltmore into a popular North Carolina tourist attraction and built a profitable winery on the grounds.

Personal life
Cecil's widow, Mary Lee Ryan, was a first cousin of First Lady of the United States Jacqueline Kennedy Onassis, as their mothers, Janet Norton Lee and Marion Merritt Lee, were sisters. 

Cecil's son, Bill Cecil Jr., serves as President and CEO of The Biltmore Company today. His daughter-in-law, Virginia Cecil, oversees the equestrian center at the estate and is on the Biltmore board of directors.

Death
Cecil died at home in his native Asheville, North Carolina, on October 31, 2017, aged 89. His death occurred 2 weeks before his wife. He is survived by his two children: William A. V. Cecil Jr. and Diana (née Cecil) Pickering.

Ancestry

References

External links
 About Us, biltmore.com; accessed October 31, 2017.

20th-century American businesspeople
1928 births
2017 deaths
American people of Dutch descent
American people of English descent
William Amherst
William Amherst
Harvard University alumni
People from Asheville, North Carolina
William Amherst
William Amherst